The U.S. Post Office and Courthouse in Ogden, Utah, United States was built during 1905 to 1909, with Classical Revival style.  It served historically as a courthouse and as a post office.  It was listed on the National Register of Historic Places in 1979.

Descriptions
It was built as a five-bay wide, three-story sandstone building at cost of $320,000 during 1905 to 1909.  It had a central, pedimented three-bay projection on each side.  It was doubled in size in 1930 with addition of four bays to the west and one to the north.  Attached Corinthian columns were added to the projections.

Its interior features a marble main floor lobby and two-story courtrooms which had, as of 1978, their original wood paneling.

See also

 National Register of Historic Places listings in Weber County, Utah

References

External links

Courthouses on the National Register of Historic Places in Utah
Post office buildings on the National Register of Historic Places in Utah
Government buildings completed in 1909
Buildings and structures in Ogden, Utah
Former federal courthouses in the United States
Government buildings in Utah
National Register of Historic Places in Weber County, Utah